Indian classical dance is an umbrella term for various codified art forms rooted in Natya, the sacred Hindu musical theatre styles, whose theory can be traced back to the Natya Shastra of Bharata Muni (400 BC). Various classical dance events are held annually across India in various cities.

This includes events related to:
 Hindustani Classical Music (e.g. Music Festivals like Sawai Gandharvain Pune)
 Surashree Kesarbai Kerkar Sangeet Samaroh, Goa
 Pt Jitendra Abhisheki Music Festival in Goa 
 Master Dinanath Mangeshkar Smriti Sangeet Samaroh Goa.
 Pt.Ratnakant Ramnathkar Smriti Samaroh, Goa	
 Smt.Anjanibai Malpekar Smriti Sangeet Sammelan, Goa 
 Pt.Govindrao Agni and Smt.Anjanibai Lolyenkar Smriti Sangeet Samaroh, Canacona, Goa.	
 PT SHRIDHAR PARSEKAR SANGEET SAMMELAN, Goa,
 Anahat Naad Sangeet Sammelan, Goa.
 Girijabai Kelekar Smriti Samaroh, Goa
 Pt. RajaRam bua Manjrekar Smriti Samaroh
 Events in Carnatic Music
 Indian Dances like Bharata Natyam, Kathak, Kathakali, Kuchipudi, Manipuri, Mohiniyattam, Odissi, Sattriya, etc.

It does not include pure Bollywood programs.

Tirumala

365 DAYS 

NAADANEERAJANAMl
Naadaneeraajanam programme is one of the most prestigious and popular programmes in Sri Venkateswara Bhakthi Channel. The programme is designed by TT Devasthanams to popularize Indian classical art of Music and Dance and also to preserve the cultural heritage of fine arts in devotional way.
This programme is jointly organized TTD & SVBC and runs for 365 days without any break. Indian classical artistes in Music and Dance find it a rare prevelage and blessings of the Lord Venkateswara, in participating Naadaneeraajanam.

Mumbai

January 

Teen Prahar
 Teen Prahar is a famous Music Concert organized by Banyan Tree since 2007
 Usual Venue: Auditorium Like Ravindra Natya Mandir, Prabhadevi
 Tickets availability: 1 week before the event
 Online booking: bookmyshow.com
 Schedule:11:59 P.M
 Duration: one day about eight hours
 Website: http://banyantreeevents.com/teen-prahar-home.html

Ninad Concert Series 
A regular Festival of Indian Classical Dances 
 Usual Venue - Sathye College Auditorium
 Tickets availability - on the venue
 Online Booking - NA
 Schedule -11:59 P.M
 Duration - One day, Four hours
 Website - http://www.kongregate.com/games/turbonuke/cyclomaniacs-2
Sharada Sangeet Mahotsav
 Sharada Sangeet Vidyalaya is a leading educational institution in the Western suburbs. It holds an annual festival of music every year in the last fortnight of the calendar year.
 Usual Venue	: Bandra, Mumbai
 Tickets availability	: Open program, no tickets
 Online booking	: NA
 Schedule	: last fortnight of the calendar year
 Duration	: Three days

CR Vyas Vandan
 As the name suggests, held around 10th Jan
 Usual Venue	: Auditorium in Chembur, Prabhadevi, etc.
 Tickets availability	: Open program, no tickets
 Online booking	: http://www.kongregate.com/games/turbonuke/cyclomaniacs-2
 Schedule	: around 10th Jan
 Duration	: Two days

Kinkini Festival - Classical Dance National Youth Festival
 An Annual Festival of Indian Classical Dance
 Organised by Sarfojiraje Bhosale Centre, Mumbai
 Usual Venue	: P. L. Deshpande Maharashtra Kala Academy, 3rd floor, Mini Auditorium, Ravindra Natya Mandir Campus, Prabhadevi, Mumbai - 400025.
 Tickets availability	: Open program, no tickets
 For Applications and inquiry	: www.drsanddhyavpureccha.in
 Duration	: One day

See also
 List of Indian dances
 Indian classical dance
 List of Indian folk dances
 Folk dance in India
 List of ethnic, regional, and folk dances by origin
 Indian classical dancer

References 

Lists of events in India
 
Events
Annual events in India
India music-related lists